Digital Combat Simulator, or DCS, is a combat flight simulation game developed primarily by Eagle Dynamics and The Fighter Collection.

Several labels are used when referring to the DCS line of simulation products: DCS World, Modules, and Campaigns. DCS World is a free-to-play game that includes two free aircraft and two free maps. Modules are downloadable content that expand the game with add-on aircraft, maps, and other content. Campaigns are scripted sets of missions. Modules and campaigns are produced by Eagle Dynamics as well as third-parties.

Gameplay 

DCS World is a study sim in which players learn how to operate aircraft using realistic procedures. Aircraft are meticulously modeled from real-world data, including authentic flight models and subsystems and detailed cockpits with interactive buttons and switches. Digital manuals document the history, systems, and operation of each aircraft in extensive detail. The game has extensive support for joysticks and HOTAS input devices ranging from gamepads to 1:1 replica cockpits. 

DCS World supports a wide variety of combat operations including combat air patrol, dogfighting, airstrikes, close air support, SEAD, and airlifts. Dozens of military airplanes and helicopters are available, spanning eras from World War II through the Cold War into the early 21st century. Popular modules include the AH-64D, F-16C, F/A-18C, F-14, and A-10C.

A mission editor is included for users to create their own scenarios and campaigns with support for scripting in Lua. Users can host their own servers with user-made missions for PVE and PVP multiplayer. The community has developed tools to create missions using procedural generation and hosts servers that simulate dynamic battlefields.

DCS World acts as a unified modular platform, in contrast to previous installments in the series which were standalone products. This allows users of different modules to switch between aircraft and play together within a single game client. The platform also allows third-party developers to publish modules through Eagle Dynamics' storefront. Community mods have also been produced, such as the A-4E, T-45C and UH-60L.

Use as a training aid 
Some air forces have used DCS in lieu of a professional flight simulator because of its very high fidelity.

The United States Air Force's 355th Training Squadron at Davis-Monthan AFB currently makes use of the A-10C II module as an instrument and weapons-system trainer. The use of virtual reality headsets is also preferred for a more immersive experience.

The Armee de l'Air makes use of DCS World for both instrument and tactical training with the Mirage 2000C module, citing insufficient numbers of professional simulators.

Ukrainian pilots have trained using the A-10C II module for DCS World. The training program is a joint military-civilian effort "to prepare a cadre of Ukrainian A-10 pilots for the hoped-for day when the U.S. does supply Ukraine with the planes."

Setting 
DCS World has a number of maps available from Eagle Dynamics and third parties:

 Caucasus - The default map for the game. Includes areas of Georgia, Russia, Crimea and the Black Sea
 Nevada Test and Training Range - A U.S. Air Force training range and location of the Red Flag exercise, which includes Nellis Air Force Base, Creech Air Force Base, Groom Lake, Las Vegas, McCarran International Airport and Hoover Dam
 Persian Gulf - A map centered around the Strait of Hormuz, it includes the United Arab Emirates, as well as areas of Oman and Iran
 Sinai - A third-party map representing the Sinai Peninsula, eastern Egypt and southern Israel
 Syria - A third-party map centered around most of Syria, Cyprus and Lebanon and areas of Turkey, Israel, Jordan and Iraq
 Mariana Islands - A free map centered around the Mariana island chain, including Guam, Rota, Tinian, Saipan, and "a score of lesser islands"
 South Atlantic - A third-party map including Argentina, Chile, and the Falkland Islands
 "The Channel" - A map of the southeast of England and northeastern France during World War II
 Normandy 1944 - A third-party map centered on the World War II battlefield of Normandy, France

Development 

DCS World traces its lineage directly from the Flanker and Lock On: Modern Air Combat series of combat flight simulator games. Three standalone titles were released under the DCS name from 2008 through 2011. The first was DCS: Black Shark as a simulation of the Kamov Ka-50. DCS: A-10C Warthog, a standalone simulation of the A-10C, was released in February 2011. An upgrade for Black Shark, DCS: Black Shark 2, was released in November 2011 and allowed for network multiplayer with Warthog.

The open beta of DCS World was launched in May 2012. Warthog and Black Shark 2 were made available as modules. Flaming Cliffs 3 was released later that year, which added aircraft from Lock On as modules of DCS World. The first third-party module, the Bell UH-1H Huey, was also announced in 2012.

DCS World 1.5 was released in October 2015 featuring a new DirectX 11 graphics engine and a unified executable.

In November 2015, DCS World 2.0 was released as an open alpha while 1.5 continued to be supported as a stable release. 2.0 added support for more detailed terrain including the Nevada Test and Training Range map. DCS World 2.1 was released in 2017 and added support for deferred shading and physically based rendering, followed by DCS World 2.2 that same year. The next major release, DCS World 2.5, added an improved Caucasus map in 2018. 2.5 replaced 1.5 as the stable release version coinciding with a Steam release.

DCS World 2.7 was released as an open beta in April 2021, with new weather and clouds as well as improved piston engine simulation. 2.7 became the stable release in June of that year. DCS World 2.8 was released as an open beta in October 2022, improving atmospheric effects and AI basic fighter maneuvers.

Over the course of development, modules have introduced new features to the simulator including improved flight models and damage models, multi-crew aircraft with multiple players or AI acting as crew and enhanced FLIR simulation.

Reception 
PC Gamer reviewed the DCS: A-10C Warthog module with a rating of 92/100. IGN praised the care and attention to detail, though remarking a level of inaccessibility: "Yes, there is a 44-page 'Quickstart' guide and yes, there are tutorials – a bevy of lengthy, highly instructive tutorials, actually – but precious little of this is designed for the neophyte or even the marginally experienced jet jock." 

SimHQ praised the Ka-50 module, noting the attention to technical details such as the recoil of the main gun affecting flight dynamics, along with smaller details such as the windscreen wiper having several modes. Also noted was the difficulty of flying the helicopter. The Ka-50 simulation earned SimHQ's Simulation Product of the Year award for 2008.

PC Pilot reviewed the third-party F-14 Tomcat module with a score of 97/100. The review concluded that "[DCS: F-14 Tomcat] is truly one of the greatest simulation modules ever created for a PC flight simulator." The complexity and depth of the multi-crew cockpit and systems was described as exceptional.

HeliSimmer.com's article on the work-in-progress AH-64D module's early access version praised the 3D modeling and soundscape while noting the incomplete systems and critiquing the flight model's accuracy compared to a real helicopter. Despite these shortcomings, it was said to be "the best representation of an AH-64D since Jane's Longbow 2."

References

External links 
 
 Official forums

2008 video games
Combat flight simulators
Helicopter video games
Open-world video games
Windows games
Windows-only games
Video games developed in Russia
Lua (programming language)-scripted video games
Multiplayer vehicle operation games